Thomas Powers (born December 12, 1940 in New York City) is an American author and intelligence expert.

He was awarded the Pulitzer Prize for National Reporting in 1971 together with Lucinda Franks for his articles on Weatherman member Diana Oughton (1942-1970). He was also the recipient of the Olive Branch award in 1984 for a cover story on the Cold War that appeared in The Atlantic, a 2007 Berlin Prize, and for his 2010 book on Crazy Horse the Los Angeles Times Book Prize for History.

Life and works
Born in New York City in 1940, he was a 1958 graduate of Tabor Academy. Powers later attended Yale University, where he graduated in 1964 with a degree in English. At first he worked for the Rome Daily American in Italy, later for United Press International. In 1970 he became a freelance writer.

Powers is the author of six works of non-fiction and one novel. His The Man who Kept Secrets: Richard Helms and the CIA (1979) is "widely regarded as one of the best books ever written on the subject of intelligence." His work on Werner Heisenberg tracks secret developments in nuclear physics during the 1930s and early 1940s.

The revised edition of his Intelligence Wars contains twenty-eight articles previously published in the New York Review of Books and the New York Times Book Review from 1983 to 2004. His most recent book follows the life of Crazy Horse (died Nebraska 1877). Evan Thomas in The New York Times, while reviewing this book, also commented broadly on Powers as an author and a previous work on Richard Helms:

Powers is "a great journalistic anthropologist. In possibly the best book ever written about the C.I.A, The Man Who Kept the Secrets, Powers took the reader on a fascinating journey into the world of secret intelligence gathering and covert action. The C.I.A. was, at least in the early years of the cold war, a tribe as mysterious and exotic as the Great Plains Sioux of the 1870s. And Powers tells us much that is revealing and often moving about the Sioux in their last days as free warriors".

Powers has been a contributor to The New York Review of Books, The Atlantic, The Los Angeles Times, The New York Times Book Review, Harper's, The Nation, Commonweal, and Rolling Stone.

Besides writing, Powers joined a partnership to found in 1993 a publishing company, Steerforth Press. Originally located in South Royalton, Vermont, it is now located in Hanover, New Hampshire. Its website self describes as a "small independent house" with a "range of titles on a variety of topics".

Powers and his wife Candace live in Vermont. In 1979 he was living with his wife and three daughters in New York City. "He is currently writing a memoir of his father, who once told him that the last time he met Clare Boothe Luce was in the office of Allen Dulles."

Bibliography 
 Diana: The Making of a Terrorist, Houghton Mifflin, 1971, 
 ‘’The War at Home’’, Grossman, 1973
 The Man Who Kept the Secrets: Richard Helms and the CIA, Knopf, 1979, 
 Thinking About the Next War, Knopf, 1982, 
 
 The Confirmation, Knopf, 2000, a novel
 
revised and expanded edition, 2004.

References

External links 
Powers archive from The New York Review of Books
Friends of the Little Bighorn Battlefield review The Killing of Crazy Horse
American Academy per Thomas Powers (no longer current)

1940 births
Living people
American reporters and correspondents
The Atlantic (magazine) people
Berlin Prize recipients
Espionage writers
Historians of the Central Intelligence Agency
Pulitzer Prize for National Reporting winners
Tabor Academy (Massachusetts) alumni
Yale University alumni
Fellows of the American Physical Society